Cuprosklodowskite is a secondary uranium mineral formed by alteration of earlier uranium minerals. Its empirical formula is Cu(UO2)2(HSiO4)2·6(H2O).  Cuprosklodowskite is a nesosilicate mineral, It is grass green to dark green in color, and its crystal habit is typically acicular, flat bladed crystals. It is a strongly radioactive mineral.

Cuprosklodowskite was discovered in 1933 at the Kalongwe deposit in (then) Katanga province, Belgian Congo, the type locality. It was named in the mistaken belief that the mineral was the copper analogue of sklodowskite, which in turn was named for Marie Skłodowska Curie (1867–1934).

It occurs in association with becquerelite, brochantite, uranophane, kasolite, vandenbrandeite, liebigite 
and compreignacite.

References

Uranium(VI) minerals
Copper(II) minerals
Nesosilicates
Triclinic minerals
Minerals in space group 2
Minerals described in 1933